Crenicichla heckeli is a species of cichlid native to South America. It is found in the Amazon River basin and in the Trombetas River close to Cachoeira Porteira, Brazil.

The fish is named in honor of Austrian ichthyologist Johann Jakob Heckel (1790-1857), who proposed the genus Crenicichla in 1840 and described its first ten species of which nine are still valid today.

References

Kullander, S.O., 2003. Cichlidae (Cichlids). p. 605-654. In R.E. Reis, S.O. Kullander and C.J. Ferraris, Jr. (eds.) Checklist of the Freshwater Fishes of South and Central America. Porto Alegre: EDIPUCRS, Brasil.

heckeli
Freshwater fish of Brazil
Fish of the Amazon basin
Taxa named by Alex Ploeg
Fish described in 1989